The Sideco House, also called the Crispulo Sideco House, is a historic house located in San Isidro, Nueva Ecija, Philippines, close to the Pampanga River. It was once the headquarters of the First Philippine Republic in 1899.

Background 
The municipality of San Isidro was proclaimed as the capital of the Philippines on March 29, 1899, by General Emilio Aguinaldo, the recognized first president of the Philippines. During his stay in San Isidro, the house owned by Captain Crispulo "Pulong" Sideco served as the de facto residence and office of Aguinaldo as president.

The house ceased to be the presidential seat when San Isidro fell to the Americans on May 17, 1899. This caused Aguinaldo to move the government seat to Angeles, Pampanga. The March 1901 capture of Aguinaldo, which ended the First Philippine Republic, was planned in this house by American General Frederick Funston.

Images

See also 
 Malacañang Palace
 Aguinaldo Shrine

References

Houses in the Philippines
Buildings and structures in Nueva Ecija
Emilio Aguinaldo